Haplochromis rufocaudalis is a species of cichlid endemic to Lake Victoria where it is known with certainty from Sengerema, the Speke Gulf and Mwanza Gulf though it may occur in other locations.  This species can reach a length of  SL.

References

rufocaudalis
Fish described in 1998
Fish of Lake Victoria
Taxonomy articles created by Polbot